Viktor Antonov may refer to:

 Viktor Antonov (politician) (born 1951), Russian politician
 Viktor Antonov (art director) (born 1972), Bulgarian art director